
Gmina Grabów nad Prosną is an urban-rural gmina (administrative district) in Ostrzeszów County, Greater Poland Voivodeship, in west-central Poland.

Villages
Apart from the town of Grabów nad Prosną, Gmina Grabów nad Prosną contains the villages and settlements of Bobrowniki, Bukownica, Chlewo, Dębicze, Giżyce, Grabów-Pustkowie, Grabów-Wójtostwo, Kopeć, Książenice, Kuźnica Bobrowska, Marszałki, Siekierzyn, Skrzynki, Smolniki and Zawady.

Neighbouring gminas
Gmina Grabów nad Prosną is bordered by the gminas of Czajków, Doruchów, Galewice, Kraszewice, Mikstat, Ostrzeszów and Sieroszewice.

References
Polish official population figures 2006

Grabow nad Prosna
Ostrzeszów County